Pida postalba is a species of moth of the subfamily Lymantriinae first described by Wileman in 1910. It is found in Taiwan.

References

Moths described in 1910
Lymantriinae